Deepti Hajela is an American journalist who has been a newswoman for the Associated Press since 1996. She works in the New York bureau of the AP, covering a wide range of stories in the metropolitan region. In addition to breaking news and feature stories, she occasionally does music and book reviews (including quick-turnaround reviews of some of the Harry Potter books in the days after their release). She was president of the South Asian Journalists Association from 2005 to 2008.

Hajela is a 1996 graduate of Northwestern University's Medill School of Journalism.

Notes

1970s births
Journalists from New Jersey
Living people
Medill School of Journalism alumni
American women journalists
American writers of Indian descent
American sportswriters
21st-century American women